Clones railway station was on the Dundalk and Enniskillen Railway in Ireland.

The Dundalk and Enniskillen Railway opened the station on 26 June 1858.

On 11 February 1922 at the station a group of Irish Republican Army volunteers attempted to ambush a party of Ulster Special Constabulary policemen travelling on a train through Clones.  The volunteers entered a carriage of a train and ordered the Specials to put their hand up. IRA. Commandant Matthew Fitzpatrick was shot and in the ensuing fight, 4 Specials lost their lives.

It closed on 1 October 1957.

Routes

References

Clones, County Monaghan
Disused railway stations in County Monaghan
Railway stations opened in 1858
Railway stations closed in 1957